The Covenanting Association of Reformed and Presbyterian Churches (CARPC) is a Reformed Presbyterian denomination founded in 2002 in California, in United States. It was formed in 2002 with 3 congregations in California and Washington.

In 2015, it was formed by 2 local churches, the Evangelical Reformed Church in Sacramento and the Grace Presbyterian Church in Redding.

Doctrine 

The denomination subscribes to the Three Forms of Unity (Belgic Confession, Heidelberg Catechism and Canons of Dort), the Westminster Confession,  Westminster Shorter Catechism and Westminster Larger Catechism.

Interecclesiastical Relations 

In 2004, the denomination sent delegates to meetings of the Presbytery of the Covenant Reformed Presbyterian Church.

Churches 
Evangelical Reformed Church- Sacramento, CA
Pastor: Rev. Wayne Leigh

Grace Presbyterian Church- Redding, CA
Pastor: Rev. David Th. Stark
Associate Pastor-Home Missions: Rev. Carl W. Miller

References 

Christian organizations established in 2002
Calvinist denominations established in the 21st century